Chausson may refer to:

Chausson (surname)
Société des usines Chausson, defunct French bus and car parts manufacturers
Chausson (recreational vehicle), French manufacturer of recreational vehicles
Chausson (martial arts), French martial art
Ernest Chausson, a French romantic composer